Villers-le-Sec is a commune in the Marne department in northeastern France.

See also
Communes of the Marne department

References

Villerslesec